Al-Qāsim ibn Muḥammad ibn Abī Bakr (born 36 or 38 AH and died 106 AH  or 108 AH; corresponding to  660/662 and 728/730) was a jurist in early Islam.

In the Naqshbandi Sufi order (originated in the 14th century) he is regarded as a link in the Golden Chain, in which he was purportedly succeeded by his maternal grandson Ja'far al-Sadiq.

Biography
Al-Qāsim ibn Muhammad ibn Abī Bakr was born on a Thursday, in the month of Ramadan, on 36 / 38 AH (approximately).

Family
Al-Qāsim's father was Muhammad, son of the first Rashidun Caliph, Abu Bakr. His paternal aunt was Aisha, one of the wives of the Islamic prophet Muhammad. Some traditions state that Al-Qāsim's mother was a daughter of Yazdegerd III and a sister of Shahrbanu, the mother of fourth Shi'a Imam, Ali ibn Husayn.

Al-Qāsim married Asma, a daughter of his paternal uncle Abdul-Rahman ibn Abi Bakr. They were the parents of a daughter, Umm Farwah.  The latter later married Ali's son Muhammad al-Baqir and became the mother of the sixth Shi'a Imam, Ja'far as-Sadiq. Al-Qāsim also had a son named Abdur-Rahman.

Life

Aisha lived until old age and taught her nephew Qasim ibn Muhammad ibn Abi Bakr. Many Hadith are quoted through Qasim.

He learned hadith and fiqh from his aunt and from Ibn Abbas. He was a transmitter of hadith.

He was among The Seven Fuqaha of Medina who were largely responsible for the transmission of knowledge from Medina and were the source of much of the information of Islam and the Sunnah available today.

He left and went to al-Qudayd, a place between Makkah and Madinah on the 9th of Muharram, where he died. The year was 108 (or 109) AH/730 or 731 CE, and he was seventy years old.

Early Islam scholars

See also
Salaf
The Seven Fuqaha of Medina
Naqshbandi Haqqani Sufi Order

References

Further reading
  Classical Islam and the Naqshbandi Sufi Tradition, Shaykh Muhammad Hisham Kabbani, Islamic Supreme Council of America (June 2004), .
 The Approach of Armageddon: An Islamic Perspective, Shaykh Muhammad Hisham Kabbani , (June 2003), .

External links
 Biodata at MuslimScholars.info

Tabi‘un
Sunni fiqh scholars
Naqshbandi order
660s births
8th-century deaths
Year of birth unknown
8th-century Arabs